Pentameter ('measuring five (feet)') is a poetic meter. А poem is said to be written in a particular pentameter when the lines of the poem have the length of five feet, where a 'foot' is a combination of a particular number (1 or 2) of unstressed (or weak) syllables and a stressed (or strong) syllable. Depending on the pattern of feet, pentameter can be iambic (one of three two-syllable meters alongside trochaic and spondaic) or dactylic (one of two three-syllable meters alongside anapestic).

Poetic forms